Ivan Shilov (3 September 1930 – 22 December 2021) was a Soviet-Russian politician. A member of the Communist Party, he served as Deputy Minister of Internal Affairs from 1988 to 1991. Shilov died on 22 December 2021, at the age of 91.

References

1930 births
2021 deaths
20th-century Russian politicians
Communist Party of the Soviet Union members
People from Kemerovo Oblast
Soviet politicians